Paco or Paço is the surname of:

 Alain Paco (born 1952), French rugby union coach and former player
 Janaq Paço (1914-1991), Albanian sculptor
 Marianela Paco (born 1976), Bolivian journalist, lawyer, and politician
 Viktor Paço (born 1974), Albanian former footballer

See also
 Raffaele di Paco (1908-1996), Italian road racing cyclist